Thap Chang is a khwaeng (subdistrict) of Saphan Sung District, in Bangkok, Thailand. In 2020, it had a total population of 25,273 people.

References

Subdistricts of Bangkok
Saphan Sung district